Valentin A. Bazhanov (born 10 January 1953 in Kazan, Russia) is a professor, chairperson of Philosophy Department at Ulyanovsk State University, Russia.

He received his Kandidature (PhD) from Leningrad University (1989), and was awarded the degree of Dr. Sci. in Philosophy from Institute of Philosophy of the USSR Academy of Sciences (Moscow) in 1988. He has been on the faculty of Philosophy at Kazan University since 1979 until 1993. He has been the Senior Research member at the Institute of Philosophy (Moscow) in 1987–88. Since 1993 he is at Ulyanovsk branch of Moscow State University (Ulyanovsk-Simbirsk University), Department of Philosophy, The Dean of the Humanities (1993 – October, 1995).

The scope of his research includes history and philosophy of science, especially history of logic in Russia and the USSR, philosophy of logic and philosophy of mathematics, epistemology, and political philosophy.

He is a winner of USSR Academy of Sciences prize for young researchers (1985), Kazan University First prize (1989), International Science Foundation winner (1994), British Academy Fellow (1998).

In 2002 V.A. Bazhanov was elected corresponding member and in 2009 as full member of Academie Internationale de Philosophie des Sciences in Brussels.

Selected publications

Articles

 The Fate of One Forgotten Idea: N. A. Vasiliev and His Imaginary Logic. In: Studies in Soviet Thought, 1990, vol.39, N 3–4, pp. 333–341.
 Shadow Science in the Soviet Union. In: Philosophy and Social Action, 1991, Vol. 17, No. 3–4, pp. 89–99.
 C.S. Peirce's Influence on the Logical Work of N. A. Vasiliev. In: Modern Logic, 1992, vol. 3, N 1, pp. 45–51.
 The Imaginary Geometry of N.I. Lobachevsky and Imaginary Logic of N.A. Vasiliev. In: Modern Logic, 1994, Vol. 4, No. 2, pp. 148–156.
 Toward the Reconstruction of the Early History of Paraconsistent Logic: the prerequisites of N.A. Vasiliev's Imaginary Logic. In: Logique et Analyse, 1998, Vol. 161–162–163, pp. 17–20.
 Philosophy in Post-Soviet Russia (1992–1997): Background, Present State, and Prospects. In: Studies in East European Thought, 1999, Vol. 45, No. 4, pp. 1–23.
 The Rationality of Russia and Rationality of the West. In: Rationalitat und Irrationalitat. Beitrage des 23 Internationalen Wittgenstein Symposiums. 13–19 August 2000. Kirchberg am Wechsel, 2000. Band 1. S. 58–63.
 Lobachevsky, Nicolas I. In: Encyclopædia Britannica, 2000.
 The Origins and Emergence of Non-Classical Logic in Russia (Nineteenth Century until the Turn of the Twentieth Century). In: Zwischen traditioneller und moderner Logik. Nichtklassische Ansatze. Mentis-Verlag, Paderborn, 2001, S.205–217. 
 Restoration: S.A. Yanovskaya's Path in Logic. In: History and Philosophy of Logic, 2001, Vol. 22, No. 3, pp. 129–133.
 The Scholar and the "Wolfhound Era": The Fate of Ivan E. Orlov's Ideas in Logic, Philosophy, and Science. In: Science in Context, 2003, vol. 16, N 4, pp. 535–550.
 "Out the Logic of Times…"Anti-Globalization Trends and Factors in Russia. In: Europe (Warsaw), 2002, No. 2(3), pp. 79–94 (in Russian).
 Logic and Ideologized Science Phenomenon (case of the USSR). In: Essays in the Foundation of Mathematics and Logic. Vol. 1. Milano: Polimetrica, 2005. pp. 25–36. 
 V.I. Shestakov and C. Shannon: Different Fates of One Brilliant Idea Authors. In: Voprosy Istorii Estestvoznaniya i tekhniki, 2005, No. 2, pp. 112–121 (in Russian). 
 Life and Work of Pioneer of Mathematical Logic Studies in Russia P.S. Poretsky. In: Voprosy Istorii Estestvoznaniya i tekhniki, 2005, No. 4, pp. 64–73 (in Russian). 
 The Birth of Philosophy of Science in Russia. In: Voprosy Philosopii, 2006, No. 1, pp. 128–134 (in Russian).
 Non-Classical Stems from Classical: N. A. Vasiliev’s Approach to Logic and his Reassessment of the Square of Opposition // Logica Universalis, 2008, vol.2, N 1, p. 71 – 76. 
 Social Milieu and Evolution of Logic, Epistemology, and the History of Science: The Case of Marxism// Epistemology and the Social /Ed. E. Agazzi, J. Echeverria, A.G. Rodriguez. Amsterdam - N.Y.: Rodopi, 2008. P. 157 – 169 (Poznan Studies in the Philosophy of the Sciences and the Humanities, N 96).
 Dialectical Foundations of Imre Lakatos Philosophy of Science.In: Voprosy Philosophii, 2008, № 9, p. 147 – 157 (in Russian). 
 Proof as an Ethical Procedure. In: Science and Ethics. The Axiological Contexts of Science/ Eds. Agazzi E., Minazzi F. Bruxelles, Bern, Berlin, Frankfurt am Main, New York, Oxford, Wien. Peter Lang, 2008. P. 185 – 193.
 L’educazione come sistema complesso ed auto-evolutivo: il caso della Russia. In: Complessita dinamica dei processi educative. Appetti teorici e pratici. / A cura di F. Abbona, G. Del Re, G. Monaco (INVALSI). Milano, Franco Angeli, 2008. p. 194 – 199. 
 Imre Lakatos and Philosophy of Science in the USSR. In: Epistemology and Philosophy of Science, 2009, N 1, p. 172 – 187 (in Russian).
 Unknown Lakatos. In: Epistemology and Philosophy of Science, 2009,N 2, p. 204 - 209 (in Russian).
 It's Not Given Us to Foretell How Our Words Will Echo Through the Ages:  The Reception of Novel Ideas by Scientific Community. In: Principia (Special Issue in honor of NEWTON C. A. DA COSTA on the occasion of his 80th birthday ), 2009, vol. 13 (2), pp. 129 – 135.
 N.A. Vasiliev as Thinker. Centenary of Imaginary Logic Construction. In: Voprosy Philosophii, 2010, № 6, p. 103 – 113 (in Russian). 
 A Logical Analysis of Lobachevsky's Geometrical Theory. In: Atti della Fondazione Giorgio Ronchi. Anoo LXIV, N 4 (July–August), 2010. p. 453 – 481 (with A. Drago).
 Russia's Philosophical Community at the First Decade of the 21st Century and the Problem of Simulation of Philosophical Research. In: Dimitri Ginev (Hrsg.), Die Geisteswissenschaften im europдischen Diskurs", Band 2: Osteuropa, StudienVerlag: Wien/Innsbruck 2010, pp. 53–64. .
 Mathematical Proof as Form of Plea to Scientific Community. In: Epistemology and Philosophy of Science, 2011, N 2, p. 36 - 54 (in Russian).
 THE DAWN OF PARACONSISTENCY: RUSSIA’S LOGICAL THOUGHT IN THE TURN OF THE 20TH CENTURY. In: Manuscrito — Rev. Int. Fil., Campinas, v. 34, n. 1, p. 89-98, jan.-jun. 2011.
 Logic in Russia and Orthodox Church // Logical Studies. Vol. 18. 2012, pp. 5 – 25.
 Kant’s Motives in Logic and Philosophy of Science. Idea of a priori and empirical knowledge unity // Kant’s Studies, 2012, N 3, pp. 18 – 25.
 Did Worshippers Idea Really Fostered the Development of Mathematics (critical assessment of the book by L. Graham and J.-M. Kantor "Naming Infinity. A True Story of Religious Mysticism and Mathematical Creativity")? // Voprosy istorii estestvoznaniya i tekhniki, 2012, N 3, pp. 124 – 133.
 Abstractions and Scientific Knowledge Representation // Representations and Explanation in Sciences /Ed/ E. Agazzi. Milano: Franco Angelli Edizioni, 2013. P. 107 - 112. 
 The Logical Community in the USSR and Modern Russia: The Furrow Syndrome // Logic in Central and Eastern Europe History, Science, and Discourse. University Press of America 2013. P. 65- 72.
 Logical Education in Russia // Philosophical Sciences, 2013, N 3. P.98 -109 (with V.I. Markin)
 The V.I. Lenin's Book Materialism and Empiriocritism and Development of Theory of Knowledge and Philosophy of Science in XX-the Century // Russian Marxism: G.V. Plekhanov, V.I. Ulíyanov (Lenin). Moscow. ROSSPEN, 2013. Pp. 291 - 302.
 Russian Factors of Adoption of Logical Positivism and Philosophy of Science in America // Problems of Philosophy (RAS), 2013, N 11. Pp. 149 - 154.
 Varieties and Opposition of Realism and Anti-Realism in the Philosophy of Mathematics. Is the Medium Line Conceivable? // Problems of Philosophy, 2014. N 5. Pp. 52 - 64.
 Epistemological contributions to the study of science in the latter days of the USSR: rethinking orthodox Marxist principles//Studies in East European Thought. 2015. N 1-2. P.111 - 121.
 Realism, Antirealism, and Idea of Third Line in the Philosophy of Mathematics // Mathematics and Reality. Works of Moscow Philosophy of Mathematics Seminar. Moscow State University press, 2014. Pp. 231 - 252.
 Modern neuroscience and comprehension of subject of cognition nature in logico-epistemology studies // Epistemology & Philosophy of Science, 2015, Vol. XLV. Issue 3. Pp. 133 - 149.
 Russian Origins of Non-Classical Logics // Modern Logic 1850-1950, East and West (Studies in Universal Logic) / Eds. Francine F. Abeles , Mark E. Fuller. Springer; Birkhauser, 2016. Pp. 197 - 203.
 Socio-Cultural Revolution in Neuroscience: New Facets of Kantian Research Program // Voprosy philosophii. 2016. N 8. Pp. 126 - 137.
 Dilemma of Psychologism and Anti-Psychologism //Epistemology & Philosophy of Science. 2016. Issue 3. Pp. 6 - 16.
 From Under the Rubble: Logic and Philosophy of Logic in the USSR and the Ideologized Science Phenomenon. Social Epistemology, 2017. Vol.31. N1. Pp. 66 - 77. DOI: 10.1080/02691728.2016.1227394.
 THE IDEA OF NEUROSOCIOLOGY IN CONTEMPOORARY SOCIAL THOUGHT // Sociological Studies (SOCIS). 2017. N4. Pp. 27 - 33.
 Kantian Research Program in Contemporary Political Science: Neuropolitics // Socium and Power. 2017. N1. Pp. 43 - 49.
 Activity Approach and Contemporary Cognitive Science // Voprosy philosophii. 2017. N9. Pp. 162 - 169.
 THE PROBLEM OF QUEST FOR THE NEUROPHYSIOLOGICAL FOUNDATIONS OF MORALITY: NEUROETHICS // Philosophskie nauki (Philosophical sciences, 2017, vol.6, Pp. 64 - 79 (with E.E. Shabalkina).
 Opposition of Psychologism and Antipsychologism. Too Early to Sum Up the Outcome // Psychology. Journal of Higher School of Economics (Moscow). 2017. Vol.17.Issue 3. Pp. 453 - 469.
 Nikolai A. Vasiliev, His Life and Imaginary Logic Legacy // The Logical Legacy of Nikolai Vasiliev and Modern Logic / Eds. V. Markin, D. Zaitsev. Springer, 2017. P. 1 – 8. Synthese Library . 
DOI 10.1007/978-3-319-66162-9.

Books

 The Completeness Problem in Quantum Theory: the Search for New Approaches. Kazan: Kazan Univ.press, 1983. Reviews: Philosophskie Nauki, 1984, N4; Voprosy Istorii Estestvoznaniya i Tekniki, 1986, N 3.
 Nicolai Alexandrovich Vasiliev (1880–1940). M: Nauka, 1988. (in Russian).  Reviews: Voprosy Philosofii, 1989, N9; Philosofskie Nauki, 1989, N9; Voprosy Istorii Estestvoznania i Techniki, 1989, N4; Science in the USSR, 1990, N6; Philosofska Mysl, 1990, N6 (Bulgaria); History and Philosophy of Logic, 1990, vol.11, N1; Modern Logic, 1990, vol.1, N1; Boletim da sociedade paranaense de mathematic, 1990, vol.11, N2; Metalogicon, vol.III, N 3/4.
 Science as a Self-Reflexive System. Kazan. Kazan Univ. press, 1991. (in Russian).  Review: Voprosy Philosophii, 1993, N6.
 The Interrupted Flight. The History of "University" Philosophy and Logic in Russia. M.: Moscow Univ. press, 1995. (in Russian). 
 Essays on the Social History of Logic in Russia. Simbirsk-Ulyanovsk, Mid Volga Research Center, 2002. (in Russian). 
 British Social and Philosophical Ideas in Russia (19th –the turn of the 20th century). Simbirsk-Ulyanovsk, UlSU press, 2005. (in Russian). 
 The Reception of British Social and Philosophical Ideas in Russia in 17th-19th centuries. St.Petersburg: St.Petersburg Centre for History of Ideas, 2007. (with T.V. Artemieva and M.I. Mikeshin). 
 History of Logic in Russia and the USSR. Conceptual Context of University Philosophy. Moscow: Canon+, 2007. 
 Nicolai A. Vasiliev and his Imaginary Logic. The Resurrection of One Forgotten Idea. Moscow: Canon+, 2009 (in Russian). 
 Logic in University Education. Kiev; Kiev National University, 2012 (with I. V. Khomenko, V.I. Kobzar, A. E. Konversky, V.I. Markin).
Transdisciplinarity in Philosophy and Science: Approaches, Problems, Prospects/ Eds. Valentin A. Bazhanov, Roland W. Scholz. Moscow: Navigator, 2015. 564 Pp. 
 Logico-Epistemological Approach in Russian Philosophy (First Half of XX Century): M.I. Karinsky, V.N. Ivanovsky, N.A. Vasiliev / Ed. V.A. Bazhanov. Moscow: ROSSPEN, 2012. – 423 P.

External links
 
 Ulyanovsk State University and its Department of Philosophy
 Académie Internationale de Philosophie des Sciences (Bruxelles)

1953 births
Living people
Historians of science
20th-century Russian philosophers
Fellows of the British Academy